Things Hidden Since the Foundation of the World is a 1978 book by the French critic René Girard; it presents a dialogue between Girard and the psychiatrists Jean-Michel Oughourlian and Guy Lefort.

Summary

Things Hidden Since the Foundation of the World contains a comprehensive overview of Girard's work up to that point, and a reflection on the Judaeo-Christian texts. The book presents a dialogue between Girard and the psychiatrists Jean-Michel Oughourlian and Guy Lefort; the dialogue interrogates and develops Girard's central thesis.

Girard's explicates three core mechanisms that govern widespread social interactions:
 mimesis, the process by which individuals copy one another in escalation, leading to conflict
 scapegoating, a process by which collective guilt is transferred onto victims, then purged
 violence

Mimetic theory posits that human behavior is based upon mimesis, and that imitation can engender pointless conflict. Girard notes the productive potential of competition: "It is because of this unprecedented capacity to promote competition within limits that always remain socially, if not individually, acceptable that we have all the amazing achievements of the modern world," but states that competition stifles progress once it becomes an end in itself: "rivals are more apt to forget about whatever objects are the cause of the rivalry and instead become more fascinated with one another."

Publication history
Things Hidden Since the Foundation of the World was first published in French in 1978 by Éditions Grasset & Fasquelle. In 1987, an English translation was published by The Athlone Press in the United Kingdom and Stanford University Press in the United States.

Reception
The book became a national bestseller in France, and according to Chris Fleming offers "very substantial" reflection on the Judaeo-Christian texts and provoked "intense (and often heated) discussion in the upper echelons of the French academy. Theorists such as Michel Serres, Paul Ricoeur, and Philippe Sollers were all admirers of the work, and, later, other theorists such as the renowned Italian philosopher Gianni Vattimo and the Canadian social and political theorist Charles Taylor expressed - and, indeed, continue to express - more than a token admiration for Girard's project."

References

Bibliography
Books

 
 

1978 non-fiction books
Books by René Girard
Éditions Grasset books
French non-fiction books